Homa Rousta (‎; 26 September 1946 – 26 September 2015) was an Iranian film and stage actress. She was the widow of stage director Hamid Samandarian.

She graduated with a degree in theatre from the School of Dramatic Arts in Bucharest. She started her career in 1971. Her most famous performance was in From Karkheh to Rhine (1992), for which she was nominated for the best actress Simorgh at the Fajr Film Festival.

She died of cancer on 26 September 2015 in a hospital in Los Angeles, California, United States. Her body was transferred to Iran and was buried at Behesht Zahra alongside her husband's grave.

Selected filmography

References

External links

1944 births
2015 deaths
People from Tehran
Iranian translators
People from Los Angeles
Iranian film actresses
Iranian stage actresses
Deaths from breast cancer
Iranian women film directors
Iranian television actresses
Deaths from cancer in California
Burials at artist's block of Behesht-e Zahra